The North Soto Province is  a province of the Santander Department of Colombia.

References 

Provinces of Santander Department